Zambezia is the second most-populous province of Mozambique, located in the central coastal region south-west of Nampula Province and north-east of Sofala Province. It has a population of 5.11 million, according to the 2017 census. The provincial capital is Quelimane.

Zambezia has a total area of 103,478 km2; much of it drained by the Zambezi River. Much of the coast consists of mangrove swamps, and there is considerable forest inland.

Agricultural products include rice, maize, cassava, cashews, sugarcane, soybeans, coconuts, citrus, cotton, and tea. The country's largest tea estates are at Gurúè, while Lioma is a centre of soybean production. Fishing is especially productive of shrimp, and gemstones are mined at several sites.

Vasco da Gama landed at the site of Quelimane in 1498. Shortly after, the Portuguese established a permanent presence, and many moved up the Zambezi into the interior, for many years the farthest inland European presence (although over time there was much intermarrying, and few residents were of purely Portuguese descent).

Districts

Zambezia Province is divided into the 16 districts of:
Alto Molocue District - with an area of 6,386 km2 and 278,064 people,
Chinde District - with an area of 4,403 km2 and 121,173 people,
Gilé District - with an area of 8,875 km2 and 168,962 people,
Gurué District - with an area of 5,606 km2 and 302,948 people,
Ile District - with an area of 5,589 km2 and 292,504 people,
Inhassunge District - with an area of 745 km2 and 91,989 people,
Lugela District - with an area of 6,178 km2 and 137,040 people,
Maganja da Costa District - with an area of 7,597 km2 and 282,173 people,
Milange District - with an area of 9,794 km2 and 515,029 people,
Mocuba District - with an area of 8,867 km2 and 306,543 people,
Mopeia District - with an area of 7,614 km2 and 115,614 people,
Morrumbala District - with an area of 12,972 km2 and 361,896 people,
Namacurra District - with an area of 1,798 km2 and 179,133 people,
Namarroi District - with an area of 3,019 km2 and 127,651 people,
Nicoadala District - with an area of 3,582 km2 and 232,929 people, and
Pebane District - with an area of 9,985 km2 and 186,330 people.

In addition, there is one municipality - the city of
Quelimane - with an area of 117 km2 and 192,876 population.

The above district populations are from the provisional results of the September 2007 Census.

Demographics

See also
 Postage stamps and postal history of Zambezia

References

Bibliography

External links
 http://www.mozambique.mz/provinc/zambezia/eindex.htm
  Province of Zambezia official site
  Zambezia Online

 
Provinces of Mozambique
Former Portuguese colonies